The 1955–56 Hapoel Hadera season was the club's 23rd season since its establishment, in 1934, and 8th since the establishment of the State of Israel.

At the start of the season, the league which started during the previous season was completed, with the club finishing 13th (out of 14), which meant the club relegated to the second division, which was renamed Liga Alef, and played in this division during the remainder of the season, finishing 7th (out of 12), remaining in the second division ahead of the next season.

During the season, the club also completed in the State Cup competition, which started during the previous season. The club was knocked out in the quarter-finals by Maccabi Tel Aviv, the eventual winners of the competition.

Match Results

Legend

1954–55 Liga Alef
The league began on 6 February 1955, and by the time the previous season ended, only 20 rounds of matches were completed, with the final 6 rounds being played during September and October 1955.

Final table

Matches

Results by match

1955–56 Liga Alef

Final table

An 18th round match between Hapoel Nahariya and Beitar Jerusalem wasn't played due to misunderstanding between the teams regarding the time of the match, and was left unplayed at the end of the season.

Matches

Results by match

State Cup

References

Hapoel Hadera F.C. seasons
Hapoel Hadera